Ruben Amaurys Mateo (born February 10, 1978 in San Cristobal, Dominican Republic) is a former professional baseball outfielder. He has played six seasons in Major League Baseball, playing for the Texas Rangers, Cincinnati Reds, Pittsburgh Pirates, and Kansas City Royals. He also played in the Korea Baseball Organization for the LG Twins.

Career
In , he played for the Milwaukee Brewers' Double-A club, the Huntsville Stars and the Newark Bears of the independent Atlantic League, where he played in the championship series. Mateo returned to Newark Bears of the Atlantic League for the  season. In , he played in the Mexican League for the Broncos de Reynosa, his most recent professional season.

He was once regarded as the top prospect in the Texas Rangers system and was frequently rumored to be involved in many high-profile trades. On June 2, 2000, Ruben Mateo broke his leg trying to beat out a ground ball to first base. At the time, he was leading all rookies in batting average. He went on to miss the remainder of the season.

Mateo won the most valuable player award during the 2013 Mexican League season while playing for Delfines del Carmen. He batted .322, leading the league in home runs (37) and finishing second in RBI (119).

References

External links

1978 births
Broncos de Reynosa players
Charleston RiverDogs players
Charlotte Rangers players
Cincinnati Reds players
Delfines de Ciudad del Carmen players
Dominican Republic expatriate baseball players in Mexico
Dominican Republic expatriate baseball players in South Korea
Dominican Republic expatriate baseball players in the United States
Huntsville Stars players
Kansas City Royals players
KBO League outfielders

LG Twins players
Leones del Escogido players
Living people
Louisville Bats players
Louisville RiverBats players
Major League Baseball outfielders
Major League Baseball players from the Dominican Republic
Mexican League baseball left fielders
Mexican League baseball right fielders
Mexican League Most Valuable Player Award winners
Nashville Sounds players
Newark Bears players
Oklahoma RedHawks players
Pittsburgh Pirates players
Texas Rangers players
Tiburones de La Guaira players
Tulsa Drillers players
Vaqueros Laguna players
Dominican Republic expatriate baseball players in Venezuela